The Uranium Medical Research Centre (UMRC) is an independent non-profit organization founded in 1997 to provide objective and expert scientific and medical research into the effects of uranium, transuranium elements, and radionuclides produced by the process of radioactive decay and fission. UMRC is also a registered charity in the United States and Canada. The founder of UMRC, Asaf Durakovic, claimed on CNN  that: "Inhalation of uranium dust is harmful.... Even in the amount of one atom".

Vision 

UMRC states at its website that its vision for the world, "is a full awareness of the risks of using nuclear products and by-products AND to contain the still reversible alterations of the earth's biosphere since the advent of nuclear events and the resulting contamination". 
They go on to state further that: "There needs to be an appreciation of the enormous effects and damage of uranium on the environment and human health. Governments, scientific communities, and the general public need to understand the many forms of contamination and specific effects. Continued abuses of uranium and radioisotopes will only lead to the steady degradation and eventual end of meaningful life on earth." www.UMRC.net

References

External links
 Official site
 Asaf Durakovic - Interview About Depleted Uranium in Iraq, on DemocracyNow! January 2003

Charities based in Canada

Radioactivity
Research institutes established in 1997